Kiladar was a title for the governor of a fort or large town in medieval India. During the Maratha Empire, the title was commonly pronounced 'Killedar' (Marathi: किल्लेदार). The office of Kiladar had the same functions as that of a European feudal Castellan.

Etymology 
The title is composed of the Urdu word for fort "Kila", and the suffix "-dar", signifying an occupation. The military historian R.H.R. Smythies originally translated the term as "Custodian of the Fort".

History 
The position of Kiladar was used in the Hindu Maratha Empire as well as northern India. Most large settlements or strategic forts in the Maratha Empire had a Kiladar.

However, while in northern India the autonomous position of Kiladar implied sovereignty, in the Maratha Empire the position was subordinate to the civil administration of a town.

Ruling kiladars 
In the case of Banganapalle, the Mughal-loyal kiladars ruled it as a princely state, which continued during the British raj, until and after 24 January 1876, when Fath `Ali Khan was granted the higher style Nawab.

See also 
 Faujdar
 Kotwal
 List of forts in India
Qiladar

References

Sources and external links
 WorldStatesmen - India -Princely States A-J

Titles in India